Lake Buchanan is a lake in the Gibson Desert of Western Australia, northeast of Lake Carnegie, just south of Oneahibunga / Lake Burnside. It is fed by Coomborn Creek on its western side.

See also

 List of lakes of Western Australia

References

Buchanan